Timothy Green Hendryx (January 31, 1891 – August 14, 1957) was an outfielder in Major League Baseball who played with four different teams between the 1911 and 1921 seasons. In an eight-season career, Hendryx was a .276 hitter (356-for-1291) with six home runs and 192 RBI in 416 games, including 152 runs, 68 doubles, 22 triples, 26 stolen bases, and a .372 on-base percentage.

Early life
Hendryx was one of six children born to William, a stonecutter, and, Nancy. He was born and raised in Le Roy, Illinois, then moved to Jacksonville, Florida. There, he began his professional baseball career in 1911 with the Yazoo City Zoos of the Cotton States League. He primarily played third base for Yazoo City, but was used as a utility player and gained experience at every position. In August, Cleveland Naps scout Bob Gilks watched him play a few games, and recommended him to owner Charles Somers, who signed him to a contract.

Cleveland Naps and minor leagues
Hendryx made his major league debut on September 4, 1911 for the Naps, playing for them two consecutive years. He played four games for them that season as a third baseman, getting two hits in seven at-bats.

New York Yankees and St. Louis Browns
He before joined the New York Yankees in 1915. In 1917, for the Yankees, he recorded 215 outs and 17 assists in a career-high 125 games.

He later played for the St. Louis Browns (1918).

Boston Red Sox and later career
He also played for the Boston Red Sox (1920–1921). His most productive season came with the 1920 Red Sox, when he posted a .328 batting average with 54 runs and 73 RBI –all career-high numbers, while appearing in 99 games.

Later life
Hendryx died in Corpus Christi, Texas at age 66.

References

External links

1891 births
1957 deaths
People from McLean County, Illinois
Boston Red Sox players
Cleveland Naps players
New York Yankees players
St. Louis Browns players
Major League Baseball outfielders
Baseball players from Illinois
New Orleans Pelicans (baseball) players
Richmond Climbers players
Louisville Colonels (minor league) players
St. Paul Saints (AA) players
San Francisco Seals (baseball) players
Mobile Bears players